Times Square Studios (TSS) is an American television studio owned by The Walt Disney Company, located on the southeastern corner of West 44th Street and Broadway in Times Square, Midtown Manhattan, New York City. The studio is best known as the production home of ABC News' Good Morning America (GMA), a morning news and talk program, segments for other ABC News programs, and various programs on ESPN.

Background

Times Square Studios is on the site of the former Hotel Claridge, built in 1911.  In 1972, the hotel was demolished and the current structure, which housed the National Theater, and a Beefsteak Charlie's restaurant, was built.  The theater closed in 1998.

The New York Times felt that Times Square Studios was meant to be a response to the "Window on the World" Studio 1A NBC had launched at Rockefeller Center for its morning show Today in 1994—which marked an era of dominance for the program over ABC's competing Good Morning America. It was argued that Disney needed its own on-air showpiece in a prominent location, and that "a dynamic Manhattan street scene is now considered an essential production element for a morning show".

The facility was designed by Walt Disney Imagineering, Disney's design and development arm, and its senior vice president of concept design Eddie Sotto. The team also worked with Roger Goodman, ABC's vice president for special projects, on its facilities for Good Morning America. Sotto stated that the design of the building was meant to symbolize a "looking glass" and the idea of "media as architecture". The facade of the building also features a video screen and a pair of news tickers, both of which are upgraded with state-of-the-art display technology every few years.

Alongside ABC News productions including Good Morning America, Disney also intended to lease space at the studio for other productions. Under the direction of Tim Hayes, notable early productions originating from Times Square Studios included 20/20, Primetime, ABC College Football, NBA Shootaround, The Insider, Entertainment Tonight, and many others between the years 1999 and 2007. The studio began to serve primarily as the home to Good Morning America in 2007 and ended their work with most other programs in the facility.

Productions at Times Square Studios

Good Morning America and Good Afternoon America — ABC News morning breakfast television news and talk program and its temporary summer 2012 afternoon counterpart
GMA3 — The permanent Good Morning America afternoon counterpart, premiered September 2018
Dick Clark's New Year's Rockin' Eve (Times Square Countdown New Year Celebrations) — ABC's New Year's Eve telecast
ABC News Election Night coverage, biennially every first November Tuesday since 2000
ABC 2000 Today — ABC News coverage of the turn of the millennium celebrations from December 31, 1999, into January 1, 2000
 ABC and ESPN — National Basketball Association (NBA) pre-game and half-time updates
 Hand in Hand: A Benefit for Hurricane Relief, 2017 (New York City portions)
ESPN College Football — some weekly and [[College Football Scoreboard|Scoreboard coverage]], an episode of College GameDay in 2017.
Good Morning America Weekend — The weekend version of Good Morning America; outside of special events, the program is recorded at ABC News' main studio at the ABC Television Center in the Lincoln Square neighborhood of Manhattan; a Times Square backdrop is projected onto the set's rear-projection screen for continuity purposes
Nightline — ABC News late-night news program
Olbermann — ESPN2
20/20 — ABC News television-newsmagazine program
Primetime — ABC News television-newsmagazine program

See also
 One Astor Plaza

References

Recording studios in Manhattan
Television studios in the United States
Times Square
American Broadcasting Company
Disney production studios
Entertainment companies based in New York City
Buildings and structures completed in 1999
1999 establishments in New York City